Isopogon axillaris is a species of plant in the family Proteaceae and is endemic to the south-west of Western Australia. It is a shrub with thick, linear to lance-shaped leaves with the narrower end towards the base and oval heads of pink or purple flowers.

Description

Taxonomy
Isopogon axillaris was first formally described in 1810 by Robert Brown in the Transactions of the Linnean Society of London.

Distribution and habitat
This isopogon grows in wet or swampy areas from near Karridale to Albany in the south-west of Western Australia.

Conservation status
Isopogon axillaris is classified as "not threatened" by the Government of Western Australia Department of Parks and Wildlife.

References

axillaris
Eudicots of Western Australia
Plants described in 1810
Endemic flora of Western Australia
Taxa named by Robert Brown (botanist, born 1773)